Justin Joshua Jefferson (born June 16, 1999) is an American football wide receiver for the Minnesota Vikings of the National Football League (NFL). He played college football at LSU and was drafted by the Vikings in the first round of the 2020 NFL Draft. 

Jefferson immediately made an impact upon entering the league, setting a rookie record for receiving yards with 1,400 (a record that was broken a year later by his former LSU teammate Ja'Marr Chase) and being named a Pro Bowler and an All-Pro in each of his first three seasons. In 2022, Jefferson became the youngest player to lead the league in receptions (128), and receiving yards (1,809) at 23 years old, winning the Offensive Player of the Year Award and amassing the most receiving yards through a player's first three seasons.

Early years
Jefferson attended Destrehan High School in Destrehan, Louisiana. A low three-star prospect, ranked by 247Sports as the nation's 308th best wide receiver coming out of high school, he committed to Louisiana State University (LSU) to play college football.

College career

Jefferson played at LSU for three years under head coach Ed Orgeron.

2017–2018 seasons
After appearing in two games and not recording a catch his first year at LSU in 2017, Jefferson was their leading receiver in 2018 with 54 catches for 875 yards and six touchdowns. He scored his first collegiate touchdown on a 65-yard reception from Joe Burrow against Ole Miss on September 29, 2018. He had two games going over the 100-yard mark with 108 in a victory over Georgia and 117 in a victory over Arkansas.

2019 season
In the Tigers' second game of the 2019 season, Jefferson had nine receptions for 163 yards and three touchdowns in a 45–38 victory on the road against Texas. On October 12, against Florida, he had ten receptions for 123 yards and a touchdown in the 42–28 victory. In the SEC Championship, against Georgia, he had seven receptions for 115 yards and a touchdown in the 37–10 victory. Jefferson and the Tigers qualified for the College Football Playoffs with an undefeated record in the 2019 season. He had a historic performance in the Peach Bowl, catching 14 passes for 227 yards and four touchdowns against the Oklahoma Sooners in the College Football Playoff Semifinals. All four touchdowns came in the first half, and set a College Football Playoff game record and tied the record for any bowl game. In the National Championship against Clemson, he had nine receptions for 106 yards in the 42–25 victory.  In his junior season, Jefferson led the country with 111 receptions. His 18 receiving touchdowns ranked second in the country—behind only teammate Ja'Marr Chase—and his 1,540 receiving yards were third most. He had eight games going over the 100-yard mark. On January 15, 2020, Jefferson announced that he would forgo his senior season and enter the NFL Draft.

Statistics

Professional career

Jefferson was selected by the Minnesota Vikings in the first round with the 22nd overall pick in the 2020 NFL Draft. The Vikings previously obtained the 22nd selection as part of a blockbuster trade that sent wide receiver Stefon Diggs to the Buffalo Bills. Jefferson signed a four-year, $13.12 million contract with the team, with a $7.1 million signing bonus. Jefferson was placed on the reserve/COVID-19 list by the team on July 27, 2020, before being cleared and activated a week later.

2020 

Jefferson made his debut in Week 1 against the Green Bay Packers, recording two receptions for 26 yards. He made his first start of the season in a Week 3 game against the Tennessee Titans, where he had his first big breakthrough by finishing with 175 receiving yards and a touchdown on seven receptions, but the Vikings lost 30–31. He followed up that performance the next week with four receptions for 103 yards in a 31–23 win over the Houston Texans. In doing so, he became just the fifth rookie wide receiver in Vikings history to have back-to-back games with at least 100 yards receiving. During Week 6 against the Atlanta Falcons, Jefferson finished with nine receptions for 166 receiving yards and two touchdowns .

In Week 13 against the Jacksonville Jaguars, Jefferson recorded nine catches for 121 yards and a touchdown during a 27–24 overtime win, in this game he broke the 1,000 receiving yard mark. In Week 15 against the Chicago Bears, Jefferson broke Randy Moss's Vikings rookie receiving record by catching eight passes, putting him at 74 receptions, surpassing the 69 catches Moss had in 1998.

By the season's end, Jefferson had set the NFL record for most receiving yards (1,400) by a rookie in NFL history after surpassing Anquan Boldin's 1,377 yards in 2003 (although his record would be broken by his former LSU teammate Ja'Marr Chase the following season). He was one of only two rookies named to the 2021 Pro Bowl, alongside defensive end Chase Young of the Washington Football Team. He was named Rookie of the Year by the Sporting News. He was named to the NFL All-Rookie Team. He was ranked 53rd by his fellow players on the NFL Top 100 Players of 2021.

2021

Jefferson's season started strong, putting up over 100 receiving yards against Seattle, Detroit, and the Chargers over the first eight games of the season. In Week 11, Jefferson had eight catches for 169 yards and two touchdowns in a 34–31 win over the Green Bay Packers, earning NFC Offensive Player of the Week. In Week 13, Jefferson caught 11 passes for 182 yards and a touchdown in a 29–27 loss to the Detroit Lions. Jefferson's 464 yards and three touchdowns through four games in the month of November earned him NFC Offensive Player of the Month, the first of his career.  During Week 16, Jefferson passed Odell Beckham Jr. for most receiving yards by a player in his first two NFL seasons.

Jefferson finished the season with 1,616 receiving yards, good for second-most in the NFL in 2021, and just 16 yards short of Randy Moss's single-season franchise record. Jefferson was named to the 2022 Pro Bowl,  joining Randy Moss and Sammy White as the only three Vikings wide receivers to make Pro Bowls in each of their first two professional seasons. For the second consecutive year, Jefferson was named a second-team member of the AP All-Pro team, missing a spot on the first-team by a single vote. He was ranked 17th by his fellow players on the NFL Top 100 Players of 2022.

2022: Offensive Player of the Year

Against the Green Bay Packers in Week 1, Jefferson caught nine passes for 184 yards and two touchdowns in the 23–7 win. During Week 4 against the New Orleans Saints at Tottenham Hotspur Stadium, Jefferson finished with 147 receiving yards and a rushing touchdown as the Vikings won 28–25. The following week against Chicago Bears, Jefferson caught a career-high 12 catches resulting in 154 yards receiving in the 29–22 win. Jefferson's third catch of the game marked 227 career receptions, surpassing Randy Moss for the franchise record of the most receptions in the first three years of a career.

Against the Buffalo Bills in Week 10, Jefferson caught 10 passes for a career-high 193 yards and a touchdown as the Vikings went on to win 33–30 in overtime. One of Jefferson's catches came with two minutes left in the fourth quarter where on 4th down and 18, Jefferson made a one-handed catch for 32 yards, wrestling the ball away from Bills cornerback Cam Lewis on the way to the ground. The catch was widely heralded as one of the greatest of all time, and his arm sleeves and gloves from the game were put on display in the Pro Football Hall of Fame.
In Week 12, against the New England Patriots, he had nine receptions for 139 receiving yards and one receiving touchdown in the 33–26 victory. In the game against the Patriots, Jefferson passed Moss for the most receiving yards in a player's first three seasons. In Week 14 against the Detroit Lions, Jefferson recorded 11 receptions for 223 yards, setting the Vikings single-game record for receiving yards, in the 34–23 road loss. Additionally, in week 15 against the Indianapolis Colts, Jefferson recorded 12 receptions for 123 yards and a touchdown, setting his season total to 1,623 yards, a new career high. Against the Green Bay Packers in Week 17, he was held to one catch on five targets for 15 yards, the lowest stats in a game of his career. During the same game, Jefferson appeared to inadvertently hit a referee with his helmet out of clear frustration, and received no punishment for the incident.

Jefferson finished the 2022 regular season with a league-leading 128 receptions for 1,809 yards and 9 total touchdowns (8 receiving 1 rushing). He won the Offensive Player of the Year award, as well as being a final candidate for the league MVP award.

NFL career statistics

Regular season

Personal life
His brothers, Jordan and Rickey, also played college football at LSU. Their father, John, played Division II college basketball. On April 27, 2021, Jefferson was the first NFL player to be added to Fortnite with the dance, the Griddy.

References

External links

Minnesota Vikings bio
LSU Tigers bio

1999 births
Living people
People from St. Rose, Louisiana
Players of American football from Louisiana
American football wide receivers
Destrehan High School alumni
LSU Tigers football players
Minnesota Vikings players
National Conference Pro Bowl players
National Football League Offensive Player of the Year Award winners